Raid dingue is a 2016 French comedy film written and directed by Dany Boon.

Plot
Johanna Pasquali (Alice Pol) is a young woman who dreams to be part of the elite national security force RAID. Her father is Interior Minister Jacques Pasquali, who pulls strings to get her in as a trainee with the condition that his involvement remains secret. He secretly plans to make his daughter disillusioned with RAID and no longer want to be part of it. 
Johanna and the other trainees are the responsibility of Eugène Froissard (Dany Boon), whose wife has left him for his brother and is regarded as a jinx by his colleagues. Froissard is furious at the idea of a woman being part of RAID, and intends to find any excuse to make Johanna leave.

Cast
 Alice Pol as Johanna Pasquali
 Dany Boon as Eugène Froissard
 Michel Blanc as Jacques Pasquali
 Yvan Attal as Viktor
 Sabine Azéma as Marie-Caroline Dubarry 
 Patrick Mille as Edouard Dubarry
 François Levantal as Patrick Legrand
 Florent Peyre as Olivier Lopez
 Anne Marivin as The psychologist
 Alain Doutey as Bernard Dubarry
 Urbain Cancelier as The president of the Republic
 Sâm Mirhosseini as Ivan

Production
Dany Boon stated the original idea for the film came to him "almost 10 years ago.", at that he would originally play Alice's role in the film. To prepare for the film, Boon met with France’s RAID (France's equivalent of the FBI's Hostage Rescue Team) in June 2014. After the Charlie Hebdo shooting, Boon changed the ending of the film.

Raid dingue was set to start shooting in France and Belgium in late February 2016.

Release

Raid dingue opened in France on 1 February 2017. The film grossed $31.6 million for Pathé, taking second place in the 2017 box office as of the end of November.

References

External links
 

2016 films
2016 comedy films
French comedy films
2010s French-language films
Films directed by Dany Boon
Belgian comedy films
Women in law enforcement in fiction
French-language Belgian films
2010s French films